Students for a Democratic Society (SDS), or New Students for a Democratic Society (New SDS) is a United States student activist organization founded in 2006 in response to the US invasions of Iraq and Afghanistan with the aim to rebuild the student movement. It takes its name and inspiration from the original SDS of 1960–1969, then the largest radical student organization in US history.  The contemporary SDS is a distinct youth and student-led organization with chapters across the United States.

Politics
SDS is a broadly progressive, multi-issue student and youth-led activist organization, which aims to rebuild the student movement through direct action campaigns on college, university, and high school campuses across the United States. While united by a commitment to direct action rather than any particular political ideology, SDS does release statements and resolutions standing against US wars and intervention, racist descrimination, police brutality, homophobic and transphobic attacks, attacks on women, attacks on reproductive rights, and other US and campus-based issues as they emerge.

Re-formation
Beginning January 2006, a movement to revive the Students for a Democratic Society took shape.  Two high school students, Jessica Rapchik and Pat Korte, decided to reach out to former members of the "Sixties" SDS, to re-establish a student movement in the United States. Korte did this by contacting Alan Haber. They called for a new generation of SDS, to build a radical multi-issue organization grounded in the principle of participatory democracy.  Several chapters at various colleges and high schools were subsequently formed. On Martin Luther King Jr. Day of 2006, these chapters banded together to issue a press release that stated their intentions to recreate the national SDS organization.  In the press release, the SDS called for the organization's first national convention since 1969 to be held in the summer of 2006 and to have it preceded by a series of regional conferences occurring during the Memorial Day weekend.  These regional conferences would also be the first of their kind since 1969.  On April 23, 2006, SDS held a northeast regional conference at Brown University.

Notable events
The new SDS has organized and participated in numerous actions against the Iraq War and made clear its opposition to any possible military action against Iran by the US. The Pace University chapter of SDS protested against a speech by Bill Clinton held at the University's New York City campus, prompting the university to hand over two students, Lauren Giaccone and Brian Kelly, to the United States Secret Service. After the threatened expulsion of the two protesters, Pace SDS began a campaign that helped pressure the President of Pace to resign.

Beginning in March and continuing into April and May 2006, SDS chapters across the country participated in a series of actions supporting Immigrant Rights. SDS chapters, such as at Brandeis, Connecticut College, and Harvard coordinated with large coalitions of students to strike and walk out of their classes on May Day.

The newly formed SDS held its first national convention from August 4 to August 7, 2006 at the University of Chicago.

On March 17, 2007, SDS groups from across the country met and participated in the March on the Pentagon, in which parts of the SDS contingent along with allies occupied a bridge near The Pentagon.  Five demonstrators were arrested.

On March 20, 2007, 83 SDS chapters from around the country held coordinated actions against the Iraq war.
One such action in the Bay Area shut down the entrance to Chevron's World Headquarters.

The Summer of 2007 was a critical turning point for SDS as a national organization.  First, SDS fielded a large contingent at the first US Social Forum in Atlanta on June 27 – July 1.  SDS found itself part of a national movement to change the US; at the forum, SDS members gave workshops, demonstrated, and formed bonds with members from across the country.

The second SDS National Convention took place July 27–30, 2007 at Wayne State University in Detroit, Michigan. Approximately 200 members of SDS attended what was a constitutional convention. The primary focus of the convention was to democratically create a national structure and vision for the organization. These goals were achieved, though all decisions made at the convention will be sent back to the SDS chapters for a process of ratification which is currently under way.

The first national SDS Action Camps took place from August 13–16 in Lancaster, Pennsylvania. The camp was hosted by the Lancaster chapter of SDS. It included anti-oppression/collective liberation trainings, and workshops about a variety of things – including media skills, meeting facilitation, and direct action. The camp was held in order to provide students with skills needed to become better organizers, and deepen the sophistication of their vision and strategy.

On September 15, 2007, SDS chapters from several colleges across the country (including Ohio, Indiana, Washington D.C., Harrisburg, PA and New York) gathered and marched in the ANSWER coalition march from the White House steps, to the Capitol building. The protest was estimated to include up 80,000 people. At least 150 were arrested, and there was at least one incident where police pepper-sprayed protesters.

In early November 2007, SDS members were again present at a similar blockade at the Port of Olympia, Washington. The blockade was broken only after 67 arrests, as well as use of pepper spray, rubber bullets, and other crowd-control weapons. A similar confrontation had occurred in May 2006 at the Port of Olympia.

Members and Chapters around the US and Canada participated in a large series of semi-coordinated events and demonstrations between March 17 and March 21 to bring awareness to the 5th anniversary of the invasion of Iraq.

The 2008 National Convention was held in College Park, Maryland. Members at the meeting decided on a national structure: the National Work Committee and a national campaign: Student Power for Accessible Education.

In September, SDS chapters from around the country converged on St. Paul, Minnesota to participate in the four days of protests against the Republican National Convention.

Members of Providence SDS took over a board meeting of the Rhode Island Public Transit Authority RIPTA to protest proposed route cuts. The group also argues that the RIPTA board is detached from its riders and doesn’t represent them.

The University of North Texas and several other chapters opened. In 2008, the University of Houston opened a chapter and added to the efforts of immigrant rights actions that Texas Grassroots Leadership had begun in 2006, holding many protests centered on detention centers in Texas, particularly the family detention center T. Don Hutto that incarcerated immigrant mothers with children in Taylor, the center in Raymondville and Houston's Processing Center who's in contract with ICE. These efforts across Texas saw a big win when the T. Don Hutto detention center changed its policies and stopped incarcerating children in late 2009. SDS at the University of Houston in Houston, Texas has continued the protests of these detention centers and plans for more in 2010.  New efforts in Texas SDS chapters are being made to support the DREAM Act, as well as 2010's May Day.

SDS at the University of Houston also participated in the March 4 National Day of Action to Defend Education, along with SDS chapters nationwide, as well as national anti-war, anti-occupation and Israeli apartheid Week campaigns.

In March 2010, members of the University of Wisconsin Milwaukee's chapter of SDS staged a protest outside the Chancellor's building. The event, designed to protest rising tuition costs, was met with a police presence. Police began using pepper spray, and arrested sixteen members of the protest, including both SDS members and allied organizations on campus through the Education Rights Campaign.

See also
Global justice movement
List of anti-war organizations
Peace movement

References

Further reading
 Carriere, Michael. "The Kids Will Have Their Say: The Rebirth of Students for a Democratic Society." Punk Planet, Punk Planet Cover Story (May/June, 2007).
 Phelps, Christopher. "The New SDS," The Nation (16 April 2007).
 Russell, Joshua Kahn. "Not Your Grandfather's SDS." Yes! Magazine, Yes! Magazine (Fall, 2007).
 Knight, Alexander. "The Rebirth of Students for a Democratic Society (SDS)." Monthly Review, MRZine (August 9, 2006).
 SDS March 20 National Day of Action: Thousands of students walk out, take to streets Article on March 20 day of action from Fight Back News.
 Lemisch, Jesse. "Sectarian Rage in the New SDS" History News Network (September 18, 2006).
 Viehmeyer, Doug. "Steppin' In Up: The New SDS." Left Turn, Left Turn Magazine, Apr/May, 2007).
The Students Are Stirring: A Campus Antiwar Movement Begins to Make Its Mark MRzine interview on SDS's March 20 Day of Student Action Against the War with UNC-Asheville SDS member, Kati Ketz.

External links 
 
 National Days of Student Action to Protest the Iraq War - All out for March 20, 2008!

American democracy activists
Anti–Iraq War groups
Left-wing organizations in the United States
Organizations established in 2006
Social movement organizations
Student political organizations in the United States
Students for a Democratic Society